Slađana Delibašić (born November 7, 1968), also known as Slađa D., is a Serbian singer and dancer. Born in Kosovska Mitrovica and raised in New Belgrade from the age of 11, she gained popularity in the 90s alongside her then-husband, Đorđe Đogani, as members of the Europop and turbo-folk act Giogani Fantastico. 

Following their divorce in 2001, she pursued a solo career. Delibašić has released six solo albums to date under City Records. Some of her biggest hits include "Sedmi sprat" (2007), "Ajmo sad u provod" (2009), "5 minuta" and "Diesel Power" (2010). Delibašić and her than-partner, Igor Matić were also the runner-ups of the first season of the reality television show Parovi (2010-2011).

She has two daughters with Đogani, named Silvija and Marinela.

Discography 
Studio albums
 Šesto čulo (2001)
 Zauvek kraljica ritma (2002)
 Nekad i sad (2004)
 Baš to… (2007) 
 5 (2010)
 Unikat (2011)

Filmography

References

External links
 
 

1968 births
Living people
Musicians from Mitrovica, Kosovo
Kosovo Serbs
20th-century Serbian women singers
Serbian turbo-folk singers
Serbian folk-pop singers
Parovi
21st-century Serbian women singers